A by-election was held for the New South Wales Legislative Assembly electorate of East Sydney on 23 January 1883 because John McElhone had also been elected to Upper Hunter and chose to resign from East Sydney.

Dates

Candidates
 Henry Copeland was appointed Secretary for Public Works in the Stuart ministry, however he was defeated in the subsequent by-election for Newtown. This was the first by-election following his defeat.

 Arthur Renwick was a doctor of medicine who was a former member for East Sydney who had been defeated at the 1882 election.

Result

John McElhone had also been elected to Upper Hunter and chose to resign from East Sydney.

See also
Electoral results for the district of East Sydney
List of New South Wales state by-elections

References

1883 elections in Australia
New South Wales state by-elections
1880s in New South Wales